Josef Alexej Eisenberger was a World War II brigadier general from Czechoslovakia.

Czechoslovak military personnel of World War II
Year of birth missing
Year of death missing